Honduras participated at the 2018 Summer Youth Olympics in Buenos Aires, Argentina from 6 October to 18 October 2018.

Athletics

Equestrian

Honduras qualified a rider based on its ranking in the FEI World Jumping Challenge Rankings.

 Individual Jumping - 1 athlete

Swimming

Wrestling

Key:
  – Victory by Fall
  – Without any point scored by the opponent

References

2018 in Honduran sport
Nations at the 2018 Summer Youth Olympics
Honduras at the Youth Olympics